Avery Jae Clementine, known professionally as AJ Clementine, is an Australian model, social media content creator, transgender activist, and writer. She is the first transgender person to model for the Australian clothing manufacturer Bonds, and made her runway debut in 2021 at Melbourne Fashion Week. In 2022, she authored the memoir Girl, Transcending: Becoming the woman I was born to be.

Early life and transition 
Clementine grew up with her mother and stepfather and her brother, Dane, and half-siblings Kiana and Sean. She also has a half-sister, Kali, from her biological father's second marriage. She is of Filipino descent through her mother, who immigrated to Australia from the Philippines.

Clementine, who was assigned male at birth, began socially transitioning into a woman at the age of eighteen. She underwent gender affirmation surgery at the age of twenty-two.

Career 
Clementine is represented by the talent agency Precision MGMT. In 2020, she was a featured model as part of a partnership between Instagram and Sydney Gay and Lesbian Mardi Gras. Later that year, Clementine walked the runway at the Priceline Pharmacy for Virgin Australia Melbourne Fashion Festival and became the first transgender model for the Australian clothing manufacturer Bonds. Also in 2020, Clementine became an ambassador for the Australian youth organization Minus18 and released her own eyeshadow palette as part of a collaboration with Australis Cosmentics.

In 2021, she had brand partnerships with MECCA Australia, L'Oréal, Pandora, and The Walt Disney Company.

In 2022, she authored the memoir Girl, Transcending: Becoming the woman I was born to be.

Clementine uses the stage name AJ Clementine on her social media platforms including YouTube, TikTok, and Instagram. In 2021, she amassed 1.5 million followers on TikTok.

She partnered with the French social media networking app Yubo for World Mental Health Day in 2021, the theme of which was Mental Health in an Unequal World.

References 

Living people
Australian female models
Australian LGBT entertainers
Australian LGBT writers
Australian transgender people
Australian people of Filipino descent
Australian women activists
Australian women memoirists
LGBT TikTokers
Transgender female models
Transgender rights activists
Year of birth missing (living people)
21st-century Australian LGBT people